Lysyl endopeptidase (Achromobacter proteinase I, Achromobacter lyticus alkaline proteinase I, protease I, achromopeptidase, lysyl bond specific proteinase, and caseinase) is an enzyme. This enzyme catalyses the following chemical reaction

 Preferential cleavage: Lys-, including -Lys-Pro-

This enzyme is isolated from Lysobacter enzymogenes.

It is produced by the human body and by Achromobacter lyticus that can help break down the protein casein in milk into smaller peptides and amino acids.

References

External links 
 

EC 3.4.21